Paprotno is a village in the administrative district of Gmina Karnice, within Gryfice County, West Pomeranian Voivodeship, in north-western Poland.

The village has a population of 260.

References

Paprotno